William Robert Neikirk (January 6, 1938 – August 27, 2020) was an American journalist, editor, and author. He spent 48 years as a reporter and served as White House correspondent for the Chicago Tribune during the Clinton administration.

Early life and education 
Neikirk was born on January 6, 1938, in Irvine, Kentucky, to parents Lewis Byron Neikirk and Nancy Elizabeth (Green) Neikirk. He earned a Bachelor of Arts in journalism from the University of Kentucky in 1960.

Career
Neikirk began his career in 1959, as a part-time sports reporter for the Lexington Herald. He would join the Associated Press in 1961, working first in Louisville, Kentucky, then Lexington, and then in Frankfort as state capital correspondent. He would then move to AP's Baton Rouge, Louisiana, bureau in 1966 to cover civil rights and regional issues. Neikirk was transferred to the AP Washington bureau in 1969 to cover U.S. economic policy. Neikirk joined the Chicago Tribune Washington bureau in 1974 to cover U.S. and international economics, serving two stints as White House correspondent. He returned to Chicago in 1988, to serve as associate managing editor for financial news. Neikirk was the Chief Washington correspondent for the Chicago Tribune from 1998 to 2008.

Neikirk appeared frequently on CNN, C-SPAN, and other nationally televised public affairs programs. He wrote nationally syndicated column on economics for the Chicago Tribune, 1980–1994. and served as news editor of the Chicago Tribune Washington bureau, from 1983 to 1988. He retired from the Chicago Tribune in 2008.

Death
Neikirk died from COVID-19 and dementia at his home in Arlington, Virginia, on August 27, 2020, at age 82, during the COVID-19 pandemic in Virginia.

Awards 
 Society of American Business Editors and Writers Award, 1978.
 John Hancock Award for Excellence in Business Writing, 1979, for series, "The Changing American Worker," in the Chicago Tribune.
 Gerald Loeb Award for distinguished business and financial journalism, for series, "The Changing American Worker," in the Chicago Tribune.
 Runner-up for the Pulitzer Prize for series on the impact of world trade, 1979.
 Amos Tuck Graduate School of Business award for business writing, Dartmouth College, 1980.
 Raymond Clapper Memorial Award, 1982, for series on Rearming America, Chicago Tribune.
 Merriman Smith Memorial Award for presidential reporting, 1995.
 Inducted into Kentucky Journalism Hall of Fame, 1998.
 Named a distinguished alumnus, University of Kentucky School of Journalism and Media, 2018.

Memberships 
 President, The Gridiron Club, prestigious organization of journalists, Washington, 2007.
 Member, White House Correspondents' Association, 1971–2008.
 Member, National Press Club, Washington, 1971–2020.

Works

References

External links 
 Personal website: https://www.williamneikirk.com  
 Scholarship fund: William R. Neikirk Scholarship Fund. 

 

1938 births
2020 deaths
American political journalists
Journalists from Kentucky
People from Arlington County, Virginia
People from Irvine, Kentucky
University of Kentucky alumni
20th-century American journalists
American male journalists
21st-century American journalists
Deaths from the COVID-19 pandemic in Virginia